In probability theory, Glivenko's theorem states that if ,  are the characteristic functions of some probability distributions  respectively and  almost everywhere, then  in the sense of probability distributions.

References 

Theory of probability distributions
Probability theorems